Acta Medica Mediterranea is a bimonthly peer-reviewed open-access medical journal. It was established in 1985 and is published by Editore Carbone. The editors-in-chief are Alberto Notarbartolo and Pasquale Mansueto.

Abstracting and indexing
The journal is abstracted and indexed in Embase, Science Citation Index Expanded, and Scopus. According to the Journal Citation Reports, the journal has a 2021 impact factor of 0.220.

Citation stacking
In 2017 and 2018, the journal retracted at least 17 articles for citation stacking. Three editorial board members were fired in connection to this matter.

References

External links

General medical journals
English-language journals
Open access journals
Publications established in 1985
Bimonthly journals